The 29th Miss Chinese International Pageant, Miss Chinese International Pageant 2018 was held on February 3, 2018. Miss Chinese International 2017 Stitch Yu of New York City, USA crowned her successor Rose Li of New York City, United States at the end of the pageant.

Results

The top 10 was notable in that there were two contestants with identical Chinese names.

Special awards

Judges

Diamond Judging Panel
Kristal Tin (Head Judge)
Leanne Li, Miss Chinese International 2005
Sarah Song, Miss Chinese International 2007
Eliza Sam, Miss Chinese International 2010
Kelly Cheung, Miss Chinese International 2012
Gloria Tang, Miss Chinese International 2013
Grace Chan, Miss Chinese International 2014; Miss Hong Kong 2013
Sisley Choi, Miss Hong Kong Pageant 2013 First Runner-Up
Tracy Chu, Miss Hong Kong Pageant 2012 Second Runner-Up

Contestant list

Notes

Replacements
 Kuala Lumpur ,  – Miss Astro 2017 winner Moon Chen was replaced by the 1st runner-up, Tiffany Teh because of her illness.
 Montréal ,  – Miss Chinese Montreal 2017 winner Becky Shen was replaced by the 1st runner-up, Jessie Chau because of her studies.

Crossovers
Contestants who previously competed or will be competing at other international beauty pageants:

Miss Earth
 2020: : Christina Cai (Top 20)

References

External links
 Miss Chinese International Pageant 2018 Official Site

2018 in Hong Kong
2018 beauty pageants
Beauty pageants in Hong Kong
February 2018 events in China
Miss Chinese International Pageants
TVB